Melek Hu, born Hou Meiling 27 January 1989, Shenyang) is a Chinese-born Turkish table tennis player. She has played for Fenerbahçe TT since 2007 and also played for An Gang in China. She has won European championships in the mixed (2010), double (2015) and single (2016) events.

Major achievements
 Played for Turkey 2008 Olympic Team in 2008 Olympic Games in China
 1 time Turkish Super League Champion
 1 time Turkish Champion
 2009 Mediterranean Games Champion
 1 time Balkan Games Champion
 1 time ETTU Cup runner-up
 Bronze medal at the European Table Tennis Championships 2010
 Silver medal at the 2012 European Mixed Double Championships held in Buzau, Romania
 Qualified for the 2012 Summer Olympics
 Bronze medal at the 2015 European Games in women's singles in table tennis.
 Competed for Turkey at the 2016 Olympics
 European mixed champion in 2010
 European doubles champion in 2015
 European singles champion in 2016

See also
 Turkish women in sports

References

External links 
 Player profile on fenerbahce.org
 Team page on fenerbahce.org

1989 births
Living people
Turkish female table tennis players
Chinese female table tennis players
Fenerbahçe table tennis players
Olympic table tennis players of Turkey
Table tennis players at the 2008 Summer Olympics
Table tennis players at the 2012 Summer Olympics
Table tennis players at the 2016 Summer Olympics
Turkish people of Chinese descent
Chinese emigrants to Turkey
European Games bronze medalists for Turkey
European Games medalists in table tennis
Table tennis players at the 2015 European Games
European champions for Turkey
Mediterranean Games gold medalists for Turkey
Competitors at the 2009 Mediterranean Games
Competitors at the 2013 Mediterranean Games
Table tennis players from Shenyang
Naturalised table tennis players
Naturalized citizens of Turkey
Mediterranean Games medalists in table tennis
Turkish sportspeople of Chinese descent